Ike Little (19 January 1888 – 14 June 1945) was an Australian rules footballer who played for Carlton in the Victorian Football League (VFL).
 
Little started his career in the VFA where he took the field for North Melbourne. He was used mostly in the forward pocket during his only season at Carlton and kicked a goal in their Grand Final win that year. This makes him Carlton's youngest ever premiership player, at just 18 years of age.

References

External links

1888 births
Australian rules footballers from Melbourne
Carlton Football Club players
Carlton Football Club Premiership players
North Melbourne Football Club (VFA) players
1945 deaths
One-time VFL/AFL Premiership players
People from North Melbourne